The Shoppes at Buckland Hills, formerly and commonly known as Buckland Hills Mall is a shopping mall located in Manchester, Connecticut and is currently owned by Spinoso Real Estate Group. The mall is currently anchored by the traditional chains Macy's, JCPenney, Bob's Stores, and Barnes & Noble while featuring the prominent traditional brands Aeropostale, Charlotte Russe, Express, Forever 21, H&M, Build-A-Bear, Newbury Comics, and Windsor.

The Shoppes at Buckland Hills is located off I-84, near the intersection of I-291.

History
John Finguerra, with his business partner, Richard Ripps, planned the mall in 1972. Finguerra worked for JCPenney, which at the time had a  warehouse nearby, once used for their now-defunct catalog business.

Finguerra's familiarity with local economic factors led him to believe that a regional mall would be successful.  The location selected for the mall was elevated and overlooked a valley, and was close to an interstate highway, which would enable traffic flow to the mall, and future developments in the corridor.

The mall opened in 1990, and was called the "Pavilions at Buckland". The mall was successful, and new businesses in the surrounding area developed. A multimillion-dollar renovation and expansion of the mall was completed in October 2003, and the name was changed first to "Buckland Hills Mall", and then to "The Shoppes at Buckland Hills".

Design/Tenants

There are approximately 145 shops and eateries in the mall, as well as four anchor stores, including Macy's (originally G. Fox, later Filene's), Macy's Men's, Children's, Juniors, and Furniture (originally Steiger's, later Lord & Taylor, then Filene's Men's, Children's, Juniors, and Furniture), JCPenney, which opened in 1992, and Barnes & Noble with two vacant anchors last occupied by Dick's Sporting Goods (originally Sage-Allen) and Sears. In 2006, Newbury Comics opened its first Connecticut store inside the mall. There was once a D&L (Davidson & Leventhal) department store below the food court, which later became Filene's Men's Store and is now various shops and restaurants.

On April 17, 2018, the Bertucci's closed as part of their Chapter 11 bankruptcy proceedings.

The early 2020's saw multiple traditional chain anchors update their brick-and-mortar fleets after being disrupted by digital retailers in recent years.

On November 13, 2020, it was announced that Sears would shutter as part of an ongoing plan to phase out of brick-and-mortar. Potential replacement tenants have been rumored in discussion since 2021.

In April 2021, Dick's Sporting Goods, transitioned to a store at a nearby plaza and was reconstructed to feature Bob's Stores and Eastern Mountain Sports. Bob's Stores opened on November 23, 2022, while Eastern Mountain Sports is expected to open in spring 2023.

In 2021, a Crab Du Jour restaurant opened. However, only a year later, on October 21, 2022, the restaurant permanently closed.

References

External links

Shopping malls in Connecticut
Economy of Manchester, Connecticut
Shopping malls established in 1990
Buildings and structures in Hartford County, Connecticut
Tourist attractions in Hartford County, Connecticut
1990 establishments in Connecticut